Martin Rubeš (born 16 September 1996) is a Czech fencer who won a gold medal at the 2019 Summer Universiade.

Biography

See also
 Czech Republic at the 2019 Summer Universiade

References

Official Results

External links
 FIE

1996 births
Living people
Czech male épée fencers
Universiade medalists in fencing
Universiade gold medalists for the Czech Republic
Medalists at the 2019 Summer Universiade
20th-century Czech people
21st-century Czech people